Lajamanu, formerly known as Hooker Creek Native Settlement or just Hooker Creek, is a small town of the Northern Territory of Australia. At the 2016 Australian census, Lajamanu had a population of 606, of whom 89.3 percent are of Aboriginal and/or Torres Strait Islander origin, chiefly Warlpiri people.

History
Lajamanu was established in 1949, on the site of the former Hooker Creek station. The government moved Walpiri people from Yuendumu, only succeeding on the fourth attempt, after people had simply walked back their own communities on the first three attempts. In the 1950s it was known as the Hooker Creek Native Settlement.

There was a village council in the 1960s (possibly earlier). In 1970, a council of twelve men was elected, including Maurice Jupurrurla Luther , who had been taken to Hooker Creek from Yuendumu in 1958. In 1976 he was appointed to a committee of four people to inquire into the role of the National Aboriginal Consultative Committee. After the Gurindji strike and handover of Wattie Creek to the Gurindji people by Prime Minister Gough Whitlam, Luther was an important figure in negotiations to allow the Warlpiri people to continue living at Lajamanu, the Gurindji being the traditional owners of the area. He also played a large part in the decision to rename the place Lajamanu, which is derived from a nearby Gurindji place name.

In November 2021 the community was put into lockdown by the Northern Territory Government, as a wave of infections hit the Katherine region during the COVID-19 pandemic in Australia.  The first COVID-19 case in Lajamanu was recorded on 1 December, a day after the lockdown orders were changed to that of a lockout.

Location and access
Lajamanu is difficult to access, mainly due to the distance from major cities and towns. Road access is via the Victoria Highway, turning off after ) onto the Buntine Highway for a further , and then 104 to Lajamanu (a dirt but well-formed road).

Hooker Creek Airport has a sealed airstrip, and is serviced by chartered flights, the RAAF and the Flying Doctor service.

Government
The town is a strongly traditional community, and is governed by the Central Land Council (Region 3, Northwest) as well as the Lajamanu Kurdiji group,a group of senior men and women of the community who promote respect for Aboriginal and non-Aboriginal law and justice within their community.  Kurdiji is a Warlpiri word for "shield", with the connotations of protecting or warding off.

The Lajamanu Council was the first community government council established in the Northern Territory, in 1980. It is a strongly traditional Warlpiri community, and the council follows the lead of the local people's council. It is a  dry (alcohol-free) community.

Demographics
At the 2016 Australian census, there were 606 people in Lajamanu, of whom 89.3 percent are Indigenous, mainly Warlpiri. This represents a drop in the population since 2006, when there were 669 people.

Language
The majority of Lajamanu residents have Warlpiri as their main heritage language.  Lajamanu School was a Warlpiri-English bilingual school from 1982 until 2008 when the Northern Territory Government introduced a policy banning Warlpiri language instruction for the first four hours of every school day.  This contributed to a significant drop in attendance at Lajamanu School after 2009. It has been reported that young people now speak "Light Warlpiri" as a first language.  Most official business and education is delivered in English.

Geography and climate
Lajamanu is located close to the centre of Australia, which has a hot, dry climate.

In February 2010 and February 2023, media outlets reported that hundreds of live spangled perch (Leiopotherapon unicolor) rained down upon the town.  However, this species has exceptionally good dispersal abilities and can migrate via overland flow, leading to its being commonly found scattered on the ground following heavy rain and mistaken reports of having fallen from the sky.

Art
Warlpiri people have a long history of creating art on wooden artefacts, the body, the ground and rocks. Walpiri art was used for ceremonial and teaching purposes, a feature of art in Lajamanu. Lajamanu artists began using canvas and acrylic paint in 1986 following a traditional paintings course held in the community.

Today, the artists in Lajamanu continue to paint using canvas and acrylic paint at the community's Warnayaka Art Gallery. The Gallery is a Warlpiri corporation and is governed by an entirely Walpiri board. Artists Peggy Rockman Napaljarri, Lily Nungarrayi Yirringali Jurrah Hargraves, Rosie Murnku Marnku Napurrurla Tasman and Molly Napurrurla Tasman have all painted at the gallery.

Other contemporary Indigenous Australian artists from the Lajamanu region include Sheila Brown Napaljarri and Peggy Rockman Napaljarri.

Lajamanu artists have been finalists in the Telstra National Aboriginal and Torres Strait Islander Art Awards in 2008, 2009, 2010 and 2011.

Notable people
Maurice Jupurrurla Luther  (1945–1985), see above

In 2010, Warlpiri elders in Lajamanu including Bill Bunter, Sharon Anderson and Martin Johnson participated in an ABC TV documentary Bush Law, about the relationship between traditional Warlpiri law and the mainstream Australian justice system.

Steve Jampijinpa Patrick (also known as Wanta Jampijinpa Pawu-Kurlpurlurnu) is an educator and has also been involved in the Milpirri festival and collaborations with Tracks Dance company.  In 2008, Patrick co-authored a research paper, "Ngurra-kurlu: a way of working with Warlpiri people". Wanta worked as an Australian Research Council-funded research fellow at the Australian National University from 2012 to 2014. In 2013, Wanta Jampijinpa wrote and directed the television documentary Milpirri: Winds of Change. The film chronicles Wanta and the Lajamanu elders' vision for making Warlpiri culture relevant to the contemporary world. The film premiered on NITV in November 2013, and has been available on SBS On Demand.

See also
 Raining fish

References

External links
 Community Website
 Warnayaka Art Gallery
 Central Desert Regional Council

Towns in the Northern Territory
Central Desert Region
Aboriginal communities in the Northern Territory
Warlpiri